Menarus is a genus of beetles in the family Carabidae, containing the following species:

 Menarus borneensis Jedlicka, 1934
 Menarus philippinensis Jedlicka, 1934
 Menarus quadrimaculata Jedlicka, 1935
 Menarus sarawaki Jedlicka, 1935
 Menarus testaceus Jedlicka, 1934

References

Lebiinae